Project Central Wind is a proposed wind farm located on the Hihitahi Plateau between Waiouru and Taihape, New Zealand. Meridian Energy is developing the wind farm, which is planned to comprise 52 turbines and produce up to 130 MW.

Consent process 
Meridian Energy applied for resource consents in 2008.  The consent hearing was held in December and Horizons Regional Council granted the resource consents in February 2009. The decision was appealed to the Environment Court in September 2009 and in January 2010 the court ruled the wind farm project could proceed. The approved consent conditions limit the number of turbines to 52 and maximum blade height to 135 m. In May 2015 the resource consents were extend for five years, until 2020.

Consent for the wind farm lapsed in May and June 2020. Meridian plans to apply for a new consent for the site.

See also 

Wind power in New Zealand

References

Proposed wind farms in New Zealand
Manawatū-Whanganui